Vagrant Queen is an American science fiction television series that premiered on Syfy on March 27, 2020. The series, co-produced by Blue Ice Pictures, is based on the Vault comic book series written by Magdalene Visaggio and illustrated by Jason Smith. In June 2020, the series was canceled after one season.

Premise
Elida has built a life as a scavenger and outlaw, but when an old frenemy, Isaac, turns up with news about her long-lost mother, she is forced to return to her broken kingdom with Isaac and Amae in hopes of staging a rescue before a deadly childhood foe, Commander Lazaro, finds them.

Cast

Main
 Adriyan Rae as Elida (aka. Eldaya) Al-Feyr
 Tim Rozon as Isaac Stelling
 Alex McGregor as Amae Rali

Recurring
 Bonnie Mbuli as Xevelyn
 Colin Moss as Hath
 Paul du Toit as Commander Ori Lazaro, later Grand Supreme Leader
 Steven John Ward as Chaz Rali
 Leon Clingman as Dengar
 Jennifer Steyn as Ihred

Episodes

Production
On May 17, 2019, it was announced that Syfy had given a straight-to-series order to adapt the comic book series Vagrant Queen. Blue Ice Pictures produced the TV series with F. J. DeSanto & Damian Wassel of Vault Comics. Jem Garrard served as showrunner and also directed certain episodes as well as Danishka Esterhazy. Writers for the show included Jem Garrard, Mariko Tamaki, and Mika Collins, with Gerrard having written about a third of the episodes.

Casting
On May 17, 2019, Adriyan Rae was cast as Elida, Tim Rozon as Isaac, and Paul du Toit as Commander Lazaro. On February 14, 2020, Alex McGregor was revealed to be Amae in the show.

Filming
On May 17, 2019, principal photography was set for July 2019 in Cape Town, South Africa.

Release
On September 23, 2019, Syfy released the first teaser trailer for the series. On February 14, 2020, Syfy released key art for the series and set the premiere date for March 27, 2020.

The series premiered on March 27, 2020 and was scheduled air its run on Fridays at 10 p.m. (ET), but the April 17 episode was preempted and moved to April 23 (Thursday) at 11 p.m. — possibly indicating that the network began burning off the remaining episodes ahead of cancellation. On June 26, Syfy confirmed the cancellation of the series after one season due to low ratings.

Home Media 

Vagrant Queen was released on Blu-ray and DVD by Dazzler Media on July 13, 2020 for Region 2. Other versions were released for the French market, an alternate UK version and various streaming services.

References

Notes

External links
 

2020 American television series debuts
2020 American television series endings
2020s American science fiction television series
English-language television shows
LGBT speculative fiction television series
Lesbian-related television shows
Space adventure television series
Space Western television series
Syfy original programming
Television shows based on comics
Television shows filmed in South Africa